PERQ amino acid-rich with GYF domain-containing protein 2 is a protein that in humans is encoded by the GIGYF2 gene.

References

Further reading